Ludvig Ojaveski (born Ludvig Mühlbach; 26 April 1892 Vihasoo – 6 August 1940 Tallinn) was an Estonian politician. He was a member of Estonian National Assembly.

References

1892 births
1940 deaths
Members of the Estonian National Assembly
Mayors of places in Estonia
Suicides in Estonia
People from Kuusalu Parish